John Westbergh (August 6, 1915 – November 12, 2002) was a Swedish nordic skier who competed in the 1930s. In the military patrol event at the 1936 Summer Olympics he won the bronze medal with his Swedish team. He won two silver medals at the FIS Nordic World Ski Championships, in 1938 (nordic combined) and in 1939 (cross-country skiing 4 × 10 km relay).

Westbergh also won the 18 km event at the 1938 Holmenkollen ski festival.

Cross-country skiing results

World Championships
 1 medal – (1 silver)

References

External links

Holmenkollen winners since 1892 – click Vinnere for downloadable pdf file 
World Championship results 

Holmenkollen Ski Festival winners
Swedish male cross-country skiers
Swedish male Nordic combined skiers
1915 births
2002 deaths
FIS Nordic World Ski Championships medalists in cross-country skiing
FIS Nordic World Ski Championships medalists in Nordic combined
People from Örnsköldsvik Municipality
Swedish military patrol (sport) runners
Military patrol competitors at the 1936 Winter Olympics
Winter Olympics competitors for Sweden